Eastern Maori was one of New Zealand's four original parliamentary Māori electorates established in 1868, along with Northern Maori, Western Maori and Southern Maori. In 1996, with the introduction of MMP, the Maori electorates were updated, and Eastern Maori was replaced with the Te Tai Rawhiti and Te Puku O Te Whenua electorates.

Population centres
The electorate included the population centres of Kawerau, Opotiki, Rotorua and Whakatane.

Tribal areas
The electorate included the tribal areas of Ngāti Awa, Te Arawa, Ngāi Tai, Te Whakatōhea and Ngāti Porou.

History
Eastern Maori included Rotorua and the Bay of Plenty, and the Poverty Bay area down to Gisborne. Originally the electorate extended down the East Coast and included the Wairarapa, but in 1954 the boundaries of the Southern Maori electorate were extended to include much of the East Coast of the North Island up to Napier and Wairoa in Hawke's Bay.

The first Member of Parliament for Eastern Maori was Tareha Te Moananui, elected in 1868; he was the first Māori MP to speak in Parliament, and he retired in 1870.

James Carroll represented the electorate from 1887 to 1893, but in 1893 he changed to the Waiapu electorate and was replaced by Wi Pere who Carroll had defeated in 1887.

He was a Mormon and was the first non-Ratana to win a Maori seat since 1938.

With MMP Eastern Maori was replaced by the Te Tai Rawhiti electorate in 1996. Peter Tapsell, who had represented Eastern Maori since 1981 was defeated when he stood in the new electorate.

Members of Parliament
The Eastern Maori electorate was represented by ten Members of Parliament:

Key

Election results
Note that the affiliation of many early candidates is not known.

1993 election

1990 election

1987 election

1984 election

1981 election

1978 election

1975 election

1972 election

1969 election

1967 by-election

1966 election

1963 election

1960 election

1957 election

1954 election

1951 election

1949 election

 
 
 
 
 

The number of electors on Maori rolls was often inaccurate hence the impossible turnout figures.

1946 election

1931 election

1928 election

1899 election

1896 election

1879 by-election

Notes

References

External links
Text of Eastern Māori election poll petition, 1876 (in Māori)

Historical Māori electorates
1996 disestablishments in New Zealand
1868 establishments in New Zealand